Sam Lansky (born September 23, 1988) is an American journalist, author and editor. He has worked for Time magazine, New York magazine, The Atlantic, Esquire, Out, and Grantland.

Early life
After his parents divorced, he lived with his father in Manhattan and attended the Dwight School. He began using drugs when he was in his early teens. He was forcibly entered into a wilderness rehabilitation in Utah at 17 and became sober when he was 19.

Career
He enrolled in the New School and got a degree in creative writing. He worked as a freelance music critic before joining the editorial staff of TIME. At TIME he profiled Madonna, Nicki Minaj and Adele.

In 2016, he released his first book The Gilded Razor, a memoir of his troubled teenage years. On writing the book, he said, "I cleaned up my act and turned my life around when I was really young. Even though it’s crazy to be releasing a memoir at 27, having not lived that long, I’m writing about things that happened a full decade ago. It took me a while to feel like I had enough distance to tell the story in the way that I wanted to tell it, but I feel like I reached a point to look back on it, and be removed enough to do it justice."

Lansky's first novel, Broken People, was published by Hanover Square Press in 2020.

Personal life
, Lansky lives in Los Angeles.

Books
 The Gilded Razor (Gallery Books, 2016)
 Broken People (Hanover Square Press, 2020)

References

Footnotes

Works cited

1988 births
21st-century American male writers
21st-century American novelists
American film critics
American magazine editors
American male journalists
21st-century American memoirists
American gay writers
American LGBT journalists
Gay memoirists
American LGBT novelists
LGBT people from New York (state)
Living people
Novelists from California
Novelists from New York (state)
Place of birth missing (living people)
The New School alumni
Time (magazine) people
Writers from Los Angeles
Writers from Manhattan